Cecilia Eckelmann-Battistello (born April 13, 1950, Vicenza), Italian by birth, British citizen, is an entrepreneur, president and managing director of the Contship Italia Group.

Career 
She started her career in the shipping industry in Switzerland as a commercial representative for Contship Containerlines. In 1988 she was appointed managing director of the company and in 1989 she became the first woman to chair the Uk India Pakistan Bangladesh Shipping Conference. In 1993 she assumed the role of vice-president and in 1996 she was elected chairman and CEO. In 1998, after the sale of Contship Containerlines to CP Ships she resigned as Board Chairman and became President of Contship Italia. From 2005 to 2010 she has been President of FEPORT (Federation of European Private Port Operators).

In February 2020 her autobiography "Il sogno di Cecilia - Una Nave Rosa Attraverso l’Oceano" was published. The book was written by the director and television writer Aldo Innocenti as co-author and published by Mondadori.

Awards and honors 
In 1992 the Times dedicated an article to her for introducing a series of containerships whose hulls and superstructure were painted pink.

In 2014 she won the Bellisario prize in the category “Entrepreneurship”.

In 2015 London Containerization International assigned her the Lifetime Achievement Award in recognition of her career in the global shipping industry.

In 2016 she was featured in Lloyd's List's Top 100 Most Influential People in Shipping.

References 

Living people
1950 births
British business executives